The Northumberland Rugby Union is the governing body for rugby union in the historic county of Northumberland, England and one of the constituent bodies of the national Rugby Football Union having been formed in 1880. In addition, the county has won the county championship on two occasions, and finished runners-up on a further five occasions.

History

The Union was founded in 1880 by six club sides. The six founding members were The Northumberland Football Club (defunct), The (original) Borough of Tynemouth Football Club (defunct), The Northern Football Club, The (original) Gosforth Football Club, The Tynedale Football Club and The Percy Park Football Club.

Northumberland were one of the very few counties to own their own ground. In 1912 they began using the land of the Northumberland County Ground and later built a stadium. Many international fixtures were played there; all County Finals were played at the ground until it was demolished in 1988.

After moving from Scotland where he played for Royal HSFP and Edinburgh, James Robertson then played for Northumberland, a local club - but not the County team. Robertson was the first known black rugby union player.

Northumberland senior men's county honours 
County Championship winners (2): 1898, 1981
County Championship Plate winners (4): 2003, 2008, 2011, 2013

Affiliated clubs
There are currently 24 clubs  affiliated with the Northumberland RFU, making it one of the smaller unions in England.  Most of the clubs in the Northumberland RFU have teams at both senior and junior level and are based either in Northumberland or Tyne and Wear.

Alnwick
Ashington
Berwick 
Blyth
Border Park
Gosforth
Medicals
Morpeth
Newcastle Falcons
Newcastle Ravens
Newcastle University
North Shields
Northern
Northumbria University
Novocastrians
Percy Park
Ponteland
Prudhoe & Stocksfield
Seghill
Tynedale
Wallsend
West End
West Tynedale
Whitley Bay Rockcliff

County club competitions 

The Northumberland RFU currently runs the following competitions for club sides based in Northumberland and Tyne and Wear:

Leagues

Durham/Northumberland 1 (alongside Durham RFU) - league ranked at tier 7 of the English rugby union system for clubs that are based in either County Durham, Northumberland or Tyne and Wear
Durham/Northumberland 2 - tier 8 league
Durham/Northumberland 3 - tier 9 league

Cups

Northumberland Senior Cup - founded in 1882, typically open to clubs at tiers 4-6 of the English rugby union system
Northumberland Senior Plate - founded in 2002, open to clubs at tiers 7-9

Discontinued competitions
Durham/Northumberland 4 - tier 10 league that was discontinued in 2006

Note

See also
Northern Division
English rugby union system

References

Rugby union governing bodies in England
1880 establishments in England
Rugby union in Northumberland